Dayan Hochman-Vigil is an American attorney and politician, currently serving as a member of the New Mexico House of Representatives from the 15th district, which includes a portion of Bernalillo County.

Early life and education 
Hochman-Vigil was born and raised in Santa Fe, New Mexico. She earned a Bachelor of Arts from Colorado College, a Juris Doctor from the University of New Mexico School of Law, and a Master’s in Aviation and Space Law from McGill University.

Career 
After graduating from law school, Hochman-Vigil worked as a Public Interest Fellow at the American Civil Liberties Union in Denver. She also worked as a regulatory attorney in Washington, D.C., frequently interacting with the United States Department of Transportation, the Federal Aviation Administration, and the National Transportation Safety Board. She also served as Treasurer of the American Bar Association. Hochman-Vigil returned to New Mexico to practice law at Roybal-Mack & Cordova, PC. Hochman-Vigil assumed office on January 15, 2019, succeeding Sarah Maestas Barnes.

References 

Democratic Party members of the New Mexico House of Representatives
Colorado College alumni
University of New Mexico School of Law alumni
McGill University alumni
Politicians from Santa Fe, New Mexico
People from Santa Fe, New Mexico
Year of birth missing (living people)
Living people